Malvin  may refer to:
 Malvin, a naturally occurring chemical of the anthocyanin family
 Malvín and Malvín Norte, two neighborhoods of Montevideo, Uruguay
 Malvin (given name)
 Club Malvín, a sports club from Montevideo, Uruguay
 Roger Malvin's Burial, one of the lesser known short stories by Nathaniel Hawthorne